Ernie Lively (born Ernest Wilson Brown Jr.; January 29, 1947 – June 3, 2021) was an American actor and acting coach, and the father of actors Lori Lively,  Jason Lively, Robyn Lively, Eric Lively, and Blake Lively.

Life and career
Lively was born Ernest Wilson Brown Jr. in Baltimore, Maryland, the son of Beatrice Gray (Walton, 1927-1994) and Ernest W. Brown Sr (1919-2007).

Lively may be best known for his roles in Passenger 57, The Sisterhood of the Traveling Pants and The Sisterhood of the Traveling Pants 2. In the latter two films, he played the father of a character played by his own real life daughter, Blake.

Lively's credits as a character actor date back to the 1970s, beginning with TV roles on shows including The Waltons and The Dukes of Hazzard. He appeared in movies including Turner & Hooch, Air America, Passenger 57 and The Beverly Hillbillies and on popular TV shows like The X-Files, That '70s Show and The West Wing. In 2005, he played the father of his daughter Blake’s character in The Sisterhood of the Traveling Pants, and he returned for its 2008 sequel. Lively was also a director, directing Blake in her film debut, “Sandman.” A father of five, he influenced all of his children as they pursued acting careers. Lively was also a U.S. Marine Corps veteran of the Vietnam War.

Personal life
In 1979, Lively married talent manager Elaine Lively ( McAlpin). They were the parents of Blake and Eric Lively, both actors. He adopted Elaine's children from her previous marriage: Lori, Robyn and Jason Lively.

He resided in Heber City, Utah with his wife. In 2003, Lively suffered a heart attack. In November 2013, Lively was treated with stem-cell therapy as part of a new experimental retrograde gene procedure.

Lively died on June 3, 2021, in Los Angeles of cardiac complications.

Filmography

 The Waltons (1975, TV Series) as Railroad Conductor
 McCloud (1977, TV Series) as Bartender
 The Million Dollar Dixie Deliverance (1978, TV Movie) as Danny
 The Dukes of Hazzard (1979-1984, TV Series) as Longstreet B. Davenport / Clyde, The Guard / Dobro Doolan
 It's My Turn (1980) as Man at Restaurant
 Drop-Out Father (1982, TV Movie) as Conductor 
 Scarecrow and Mrs. King (1985, TV Series) as Travis Wayne
 Secret Admirer (1985) as Guard
 Badge of the Assassin (1985, TV Movie) as U.S. Marshal
 Misfits of Science (1985, TV Series) as Army Officer
 The Children of Times Square (1986, TV Movie)
 Fuzzbucket (1986, TV Series) as Teacher #1
 Wisdom (1986)
 Warm Hearts, Cold Feet (1987, TV Movie) as Ernie
 Convicted: A Mother's Story (1987, TV Movie)
 In The Mood (1987) as Chief Kelsey (Papa Bear)
 Hollywood-Monster (1987) as Production Manager
 Into the Homeland (1987, TV Movie) as Tom Burnside
 The Tracker (1988, TV Movie) as Bob
 Scandal in a Small Town (1988, TV Movie) as Jeremy Travis
 The Secret Life of Kathy McCormick (1988, TV Movie) as Jeff
 Buckeye and Blue (1988) as Jess Thatcher
 Turner & Hooch (1989) as Motel Clerk
 An Innocent Man (1989) as Donatelli's Dealer
 Shocker (1989) as Warden
 Hard to Kill (1990) as LAPD Captain
 Follow Your Heart (1990, TV Movie) as Mitch
 Voices Within: The Lives of Truddi Chase (1990, TV Movie) as Paul
 The Knife and Gun Club (1990, TV Movie) as Ralph
 Air America (1990) as Truck Driver
 The Less-Than-Perfect Daughter (1991, TV Series) as Col. Deke Grimwald
 The Torkelsons (1991, TV pilot) as Jacob Presley
 For the Very First Time (1991, TV Movie) as Mr. O'Neil
 Showdown in Little Tokyo (1991) as Detective Nelson
 The Man in the Moon (1991) as Will Sanders
 Past Midnight (1992) as Detective Allan Tobias
 Breaking the Silence (1992, TV Movie)
 Stop! Or My Mom Will Shoot (1992) as Man at Airport
 Sleepwalkers (1992) as Animal Control Officer
 Passenger 57 (1992) as Chief Leonard Biggs
 Overkill: The Aileen Wuornos Story (1992, TV Movie) as Maj. Dan Henry
 The Beverly Hillbillies (1993) as Briggs
 My Family (1995) as Sergeant
 The X-Files (1995, TV Series) as Sheriff John Teller
 Malibu Shores (1996, TV Series) as Mr. Morrison
 Renegade (1996, TV Series) as Sheriff
 Mulholland Falls (1996) as Construction Foreman
 Fire Down Below (1997) as Todd
 Senseless (1998) as Coach Brandau
 The Legend of Cryin' Ryan (1998) as Leonard Greene
 Goodbye Lover (1998) as Sheriff
 Wanted (1998) as Sheriff
 Balloon Farm (1999, TV Movie) as Tom Williams
 The Thirteenth Floor (1999) as 30's Cop
 My Little Assassin (1999, TV Movie) as Charlie Baron
 That '70s Show (2000, TV Series) as Ted
 The West Wing (2000-2005, TV Series) as Mr. Loch / Georgia Congressman
 American Pie 2 (2001) as Sergeant
 Crossing Jordan (2002, TV Series) as Sheriff Roper
 The Drew Carey Show (2004, TV Series) as Mike
 The Sisterhood of the Traveling Pants (2005) as Franz Vreeland
 The Suite Life of Zack & Cody (2005, TV Series) as Irving Fitzpatrick (voice)
 The Darwin Awards (2006) as RV Salesman
 Ghost Whisperer (2006, TV Series) as Ranger Neher
 Simon Says (2006) as Pig
 The Art of Travel (2008) as Mr. Layne
 The Sisterhood of the Traveling Pants 2 (2008) as Franz Vreeland
 The Perfect Game (2009) as Coach Sam Hicks
 Saving Grace (2009-2010, TV Series) as Mr. Dewey
 Memphis Beat (2010, TV Series) as Doc Boswell
 Outlaw (2010, TV Series)
 Svetlana (2011, TV Series) as Liam's Dad
 Shadow (2013, Short)
 Waffle Street (2015) as Wright Adams
 Razor (2017) as Ernie
 Looking Glass (2018) as Tommy
 Phobic (2020) as Jack Sanders

References

External links

1947 births
2021 deaths
American male film actors
American male television actors
Male actors from Baltimore
Ernie
20th-century American male actors
21st-century American male actors